"Major Boobage" is the third episode in season 12 of the American animated television series South Park. The 170th episode of the series overall, it originally aired on Comedy Central in the United States on March 26, 2008. The episode was written and directed by series co-creator Trey Parker.

In the episode, Kenny becomes addicted to a hallucinogen induced by a new craze in South Park called "cheesing", and experiences hallucinations that are patterned after the 1981 Canadian animated film Heavy Metal, in which he pursues a buxom female in a setting whose motif is based entirely on breasts. The episode also includes references to Jenkem, Diary of Anne Frank and Eliot Spitzer's 2008 prostitution scandal. The episode is rated TV-MA-LSV in the United States for strong language, sexual content, and violence.

Plot
Mr. Mackey lectures the kids on the dangers of choking themselves to get high, as well as other methods that are becoming popular, including getting high off cat urine. Mr. Mackey explains that urine used by male cats to mark their territory in the presence of other male cats can cause one to become intoxicated when inhaled. Out of curiosity, the boys go to Cartman's house to confirm it for themselves by having Cartman's cat, Mr. Kitty, squirt urine in Kenny's face. Kenny then experiences a Heavy Metal-esque drug trip driving a rocket-powered, black Pontiac Firebird Trans-Am through space and encountering a woman with large breasts. She leads him to a fantasy kingdom, where many of the buildings and natural formations feature breast-like protrusions. At the height of the trip, as Kenny is about to bathe with her, Cartman manages to pin him to the ground and wake him back to reality, where he has been running around and removing his clothes. Kenny angrily attacks him for interrupting, but Stan and Kyle stop him. As a result, Kyle and Stan suggest that they permanently abstain from using cat urine.

The new drug craze becomes national, with Fox News calling it "cheesing" because it is "fon to due". Kyle's parents become alarmed by this and bring it to the attention of other parents, and Gerald Broflovski drafts a bill that will make cats illegal in South Park, whereupon all cats are subsequently taken into custody by the DEA. Cartman hides Mr. Kitty in his attic and suggests that he should "write a diary", and he also reluctantly hides many of the neighborhood cats (peculiarly out of compassion for the cats and not out of his usual and initial greed).

Kenny, meanwhile, is still able to acquire cat urine and is now addicted. The boys try to stop his cheesing addiction, threatening to tell his parents, and confiscate his cat. Kyle's mother Sheila finds the cat in Kyle's dresser drawer, but Kyle denies that it is his. He is nevertheless grounded, and Gerald takes the cat downstairs, where it is revealed that Gerald himself was once a user. Despite being clean for ten years, temptation takes over, and Gerald cheeses himself "one last time". Under the influence, he finds himself in the fantasy world, flying a B-17G. After encountering the woman with the large breasts, he is shocked to find Kenny there as well, having found the cats Cartman hid in his attic.

Gerald and Kenny are told by the woman's father, who is the kingdom ruler, that they must battle at the Breastriary in Nippopolis. Back in reality, a large audience is watching Gerald and Kenny fight at the playground (still believing themselves to be in the fantasy world), shocking Sheila and embarrassing Kyle. Gerald makes a public apology with an indignant Sheila by his side and lifts the ban on cats. He tells his audience that it is not the fault of cats, as the cats only produce urine, while people actively choose to use it.

Cartman says he has learned that beings cannot be deprived of their freedom. Upon hearing this, Kyle then asks Cartman whether he does not notice a similarity between the recent happenings and anything else in history, but Cartman sees none. The boys then find Kenny, sniffing a flower, believing that he is getting "high on life", but Kenny then starts rapidly sniffing a handful of flowers and is transported back to his drug-induced fantasy world, much to Stan, Kyle and Cartman's horror.

Production
The episode took eight weeks to complete, which is eight times that of a normal episode, due to the use of traditional animation in order to make it resemble the film Heavy Metal.

The female object of Kenny's affections in the episode was portrayed by pornographic actress Lisa Daniels, live-action video of whom was converted to animated form by rotoscoping.

Two different songs are alternately played in the "cheese trip" portions of the episode: "Heavy Metal (Takin' a Ride)" by Don Felder and "Heavy Metal" by Sammy Hagar. "Radar Rider" by Riggs is played briefly during the arena scene. All three songs originally appeared on the Heavy Metal soundtrack.

Cultural references
The press conference Gerald has with his wife standing next to him was made to look just like when former New York Governor Eliot Spitzer publicly apologized for being a client in a prostitution ring. Spitzer's apology occurred nine days prior to the episode's airdate. Spitzer's sex scandal was parodied again in the episode "Sexual Healing".

Reception
Travis Fickett of IGN gave the episode a score of 9.0 out of 10, calling it "a terrific episode – funny throughout". Fickett saw the episode, which he felt contained more laughs in its first two minutes than in the prior two episodes combined, as a return of the series to high quality after a less impressive season opener. Fickett lauded the episode's ability to combine social commentary with the "absurd" references to the film Heavy Metal, and praised the various "great small moments" in the story, including Cartman being oblivious to the historical parallels in his concern over the cats, Butters calmly reassuring Kenny after being vomited on by him, Mr. Mackey's realization he should not have mentioned how the cat urine can be used as a hallucinogen, etc.

"Major Boobage" was the first episode to exceed a million views at South Park Studios.

Home media
"Major Boobage", along with the thirteen other episodes from South Parks twelfth season, were released on a three-disc DVD and Blu-ray set in the United States on March 10, 2009. The sets included brief audio commentaries by Parker and Stone for each episode, a collection of deleted scenes, and two special mini-features, The Making of Major Boobage and Six Days to South Park.

References

External links
 "Major Boobage" Full episode at South Park Studios
 

Cats in popular culture
Heavy Metal (magazine)
South Park (season 12) episodes
Television episodes about drugs
Fiction about animal cruelty